OSV-96 (Russian: ОСВ-96) is a Russian heavy semi-automatic precision rifle chambered for the 12.7×108mm.

Description 
The rifle is capable of engaging infantry at a distance of up to 1800 meters and can combat material targets at ranges up to 2500 meters. As an effective anti-sniper weapon, OSV-96 keeps the shooter outside of the effective range of conventional calibers providing a distinct advantage over lower caliber rifles. Specialized high-accuracy 12.7×108mm 7N34 59.0 gram FMJ and AP sniper cartridges have been developed for Russian .50-caliber sniper rifles such as this rifle. Large caliber machine gun cartridges can also be used for firing, but with limited accuracy.  With 7N34 ammunition, its accuracy is claimed as 1.5 MOA at 100 meters or better, equal to the Barrett M107.

The OSV-96 folds in half in between the barrel/chamber and receiver compartments to shorten its length for ease of transportation. The rifle features a free-floating barrel in combination with a large muzzle brake to greatly decrease its recoil.

Variants 
 V-94 (В-94 «Волга») - Prototype was developed by the KBP (Instrument Design Bureau) in the early 1990s. V-94 was first revealed to the public in 1994. Initial muzzle energy is estimated to be 18860 J, while firing API ammunition (885 gr). 
 OSV-96 (ОСВ-96 «Взломщик») - Developed in 1996–2000, entered service in March 2000. Design utilizes a number of improvements, such as a redesigned stock, muzzle brake, and carrying handle.
 MTs-567 (МЦ-567) - developed in 2018–2019, since August 2020 is allowed as civilian hunting weapon.

Users

 : Used by the special forces
 : Used by the special forces
 : Used by the Indian army
 : Federal Security Service and Ministry of Internal Affairs
 : Used by both government and jihadist forces in the Syrian civil war
: Used by the Vietnamese military, being resembled by Z111 Factory.

See also
 KSVK 12.7 - the OSV-96's service competitor
Barrett M82 - American counterpart
QBU-10 - Chinese counterpart

References

External links

12.7×108 mm sniper rifles
12.7×108 mm anti-materiel rifles
Sniper rifles of Russia
Semi-automatic rifles
KBP Instrument Design Bureau products
Military equipment introduced in the 1990s